is a railway station on the Iida Line in the village of Nakagawa, Kamiina District, Japan, operated by Central Japan Railway Company (JR Central).

Lines
Ina-Tajima Station is served by the Iida Line and is 148.2 kilometers from the starting point of the line at Toyohashi Station.

Station layout
The station consists of one ground-level side platform serving a single bi-directional track. There is no station building, but only a shelter built on top of the platform. The station is unattended.

Adjacent stations

History
Ina-Tajima Station opened on 22 November 1920. With the privatization of Japanese National Railways (JNR) on 1 April 1987, the station came under the control of JR Central.

Passenger statistics
In fiscal 2016, the station was used by an average of 6 passengers daily (boarding passengers only).

Surrounding area
Although it is the only train station in Nakamura, Ina-Tajima is located in a rural area surrounded by orchards.

See also
 List of railway stations in Japan

References

External links

 Ina-Tajima Station information 

Railway stations in Nagano Prefecture
Railway stations in Japan opened in 1920
Stations of Central Japan Railway Company
Iida Line
Nakagawa, Nagano